The 1894–95 season was the first in the history of the Southern League. Sixteen clubs joined the new league, which was split into two divisions. Millwall Athletic won Division One without losing a match, and were invited to join the Football League but declined because of travelling.

Division One

Division Two

Promotion-relegation test matches
At the end of the season, the bottom three clubs in Division One played the top three clubs in Division Two in test matches to decide on promotion and relegation. Division Two champions New Brompton were the only lower division club to win, although their opponents, Swindon Town, were not relegated, with the First Division expanding to 10 clubs.

References

External links
Southern League Final Tables

1894-95
1894–95 in English association football leagues